Mukrakari (Dargwa: Муркарахъмахьи) is a rural locality (a selo) in Duakarsky Selsoviet, Dakhadayevsky District, Republic of Dagestan, Russia. The population was 135 as of 2010.

Geography
Mukrakari is located 31 km southwest of Urkarakh (the district's administrative centre) by road. Duakar and Urkutamakhi 1-ya are the nearest rural localities.

Nationalities 
Dargins live there.

References 

Rural localities in Dakhadayevsky District